Nikola Ašćerić (born 19 April 1991) is a Serbian professional footballer who plays as a striker for Muckendorf/Zeiselmaue.

References

External links
 
 Nikola Ašćerić at ÖFB
 
 

1991 births
Living people
Footballers from Belgrade
Association football forwards
Serbian footballers
FK Radnički Beograd players
FK Slavija Sarajevo players
FK Zemun players
FK Donji Srem players
OFK Grbalj players
FK Radnički Niš players
Tokushima Vortis players
KS Kastrioti players
Valletta F.C. players
PAS Lamia 1964 players
Al-Qaisumah FC players
GAIS players
FK Mačva Šabac players
Masfout Club players
Serbian SuperLiga players
Montenegrin First League players
Maltese Premier League players
Saudi First Division League players
Kategoria Superiore players
J2 League players
Superettan players
UAE First Division League players
Serbian expatriate footballers
Serbian expatriate sportspeople in Austria
Expatriate footballers in Austria
Serbian expatriate sportspeople in Albania
Expatriate footballers in Albania
Serbian expatriate sportspeople in Japan
Expatriate footballers in Japan
Serbian expatriate sportspeople in Saudi Arabia
Expatriate footballers in Saudi Arabia
Serbian expatriate sportspeople in Sweden
Expatriate footballers in Sweden
Serbian expatriate sportspeople in the United Arab Emirates
Expatriate footballers in the United Arab Emirates